Van Eck is a Dutch surname.

Van Eck may also refer to:
VanEck, an American investment management firm
Van Eck Professor of Engineering, a chair at Cambridge University
Van Eck radiation
Van Eck phreaking
Van Eck Redoubt, a fort in Sri Lanka
Hendrik Van Eck Airport, in South Africa
Van Eck Trailers, trailer manufacturer in the Netherlands